This list is for people who held general officer rank (including, after 1946, Brigadier General) in the regular Hellenic Army since 1828. It does not include the numerous generals of the irregular troops appointed during the Greek War of Independence, unless they also received a general rank in the post-war regular army. This list is not complete – please add to it if you know of any omissions.

A

B

C

D

E

F

G

H

I

K

M

N

O

P

S

T

V

Y

Z 

 
Hellenic Army generals
Hellenic Army